Jean-Louis Patrik Huhta (born 30 April 1965) is a Swedish musician. He has played in various bands going back through the mid 1980s, ranging from punk and art music to grindcore and funk.

Career
Huhta began his musical career in the early 1980s as a member of Freddie Wadling's post-punk band Cortex. He later joined the hardcore band Anti Cimex, in which he played percussion between 1984 and 1987. Since then, he has participated in various groups and experimental art projects. Together with Texas Instruments, he created rhythm-based industrial noise and as a member of the art collective Lucky People Center, he found his way to contemporary dance music. He has also dabbled in funk, hip hop, and go-go music with Stonefunkers. With The Skull Defekts, he toured the United States in 2009.

Personal life
Huhta's father hails from Trinidad, and his mother was from Tervola, Finland. He moved to Stockholm from Gothenburg in the 1990s and lives in Copenhagen, Denmark since 2018.

Selected discography

As Jean-Louis Huhta
 Between the World and Death (2007)
 No History No Future (2015)

As Dungeon Acid
 Bliss (2012)
 Live Somewhere in NYC (2016)
 Dungeon Acid (2019)

With Zbigniew Karkowski and Lars Åkerlund
 Horology (2013)
 A Bird in the Hand Is Worth Two in the Bush (2016)

References

External links
 

1965 births
Living people
People from Gothenburg
Swedish male musicians
Swedish people of Trinidad and Tobago descent
Swedish people of Finnish descent